Kitajima (written: 北島) is a Japanese surname. Notable people with the surname include:

Toru Kitajima, Japanese Singer-songwriter
Hideaki Kitajima, Japanese football player
Keizō Kitajima, Japanese photographer
Kosuke Kitajima, Japanese swimmer
Osamu Kitajima, Japanese electronic music composer and performer
Manabu Kitajima, Japanese millionaire
Saburō Kitajima, Japanese singer
 Tadao Kitajima, Japanese shogi player
Takeshi Kitajima (born 1977), Japanese volleyball player
Yoshio Kitajima, Japanese football player
, Japanese footballer
Ian Kitajima, Brazilian sailor

See also
Kitajima, Tokushima

Japanese-language surnames